The Sony Cyber-shot DSC-RX100 series is a high-end compact camera series. It started with the DSC-RX100, announced on 6 June 2012, and is part of the Cyber-shot RX line of digital cameras made by Sony. Seven annual generations have been released so far until 2019, all equipped with a one-inch 20-Megapixel image sensor and rotary knob around the lens. Filming at up to 1080p (Full HD) at 60fps is supported by the first three generations, the third additionally with 720p at 120fps, and up to 2160p (4K) at 30fps and 1080p at 120fps high frame rate video since the fourth.

Cyber-shot DSC-RX100 (original) 

The original RX100 was named as the  "European Advanced Compact Camera for 2012–2013"  by the European Imaging and Sound Association (EISA) and one of the 'Best Inventions of 2012' by TIME.

Specifications
 1 in. type (13.2 mm × 8.8 mm) CMOS Exmor sensor (2.7x crop factor). This uses the "Column-Parallel A/D Conversion Technique" to create more detailed images in low light conditions than smaller-sensor cameras.
 10 fps burst shooting capability at 20.2 MP resolution.
 M, A, S, P modes available
 Tiltable pop-up flash, allowing bounce flash.
 Large maximum aperture, 1.8-4.9 Carl Zeiss Vario-Sonnar T* lens.
 Focus peaking display available.
 3.6× optical zoom, Carl Zeiss T* Vario Sonnar lens (28–100 mm 35mm equivalent focal length range [10.4–37.1 mm actual focal length])
 3 in. TFT LCD (fixed) with 1.29 million dots, using RGBW configuration
 RAW shooting possible (giving enhanced post-capture image editing options)
 FULL HD video shooting (AVCHD, 50 fps)

Cyber-shot DSC-RX100 II
In June 2013, Sony unveiled a new edition of the camera, called DSC-RX100 II (model number DSC-RX100M2, also referred to as "RX100 Mark 2"). New features included:
 20.2-megapixel 1 in. type Exmor R CMOS sensor, notable for being a back-illuminated sensor
 Maximum native ISO mode expanded to 12800 (approx. 40% more light sensitivity)
 Tiltable LCD (+84°/−45°)
 Multi Interface Shoe
 Wi-Fi connectivity
 NFC connectivity
 Full HD video shooting mode (1080/24p)

Hasselblad Stellar and Stellar II
On 23 July 2013, Swedish luxury camera manufacturer Hasselblad announced the 'Stellar', a compact camera based on the DSC-RX100, incorporating a wooden or carbon grip. On 1 November 2013, Hasselblad announced another three cosmetic variants of the camera, named the Stellar Special Edition. On 26 November 2014, Hasselblad announced the Stellar II based on the DSC-RX100M2.

Cyber-shot DSC-RX100 III
The mark-III version of the RX100, the Cyber-shot DSC-RX100 III (model number DSC-RX100M3), was released in June 2014.
The camera had a new Bionz X processor, as used in the Sony Alpha 77 II, and a new Zeiss Vario-Sonnar T* lens (24-70mm (35mm equivalent), 1.8-2.8) giving a wider angle of view (while curtailing the maximum equivalent focal length from 100mm to 70mm). Unlike its predecessor, the RX100 II, it does not have Sony's multi-interface hotshoe (limiting flash photography to the small built-in unit), but includes a pop-up OLED electronic viewfinder (EVF). The DSC-RX100 III has customizable functions. The viewfinder and rear LCD can be set to different displays. The RX100 III can be set manually with shutter speed and aperture fixed, but with Auto ISO (sensitivity) giving the correct metered exposure.

Cyber-shot DSC-RX100 IV

In June 2015, Sony released the Cyber-shot DSC-RX100 IV, the mark-IV version of the RX-100. Like its predecessors, it has the same 1-inch 20.2 megapixel CMOS sensor and ISO levels 12800. The RX-100 MARK-IV can now record 4K video in XAVC-S format with frame rates up to 24, 25, and 30 fps. However, due to extreme write speed and processing power, it can only record 5-minute 4K shots to prevent any serious damage to the camera. It also features Slow-mo video recording and can capture up to 960 fps for NTSC mode and 1000 fps for PAL mode.

Cyber-shot DSC-RX100 V

On 6 October 2016, Sony announced the RX100 V. In this update, Sony improved the performance of the camera claiming the world's fastest auto focus, the world's most auto focus points, and the world's fastest continuous shooting for a compact fixed-lens camera. Sony's claim of fastest auto focusing speed is that the camera can lock in focus in as little as .05 seconds.  Sony increased the number of focus points taken per shot to 315, and also improved continuous shooting performance enabling up to 150 continuous shots to be taken at the full 20.1 megapixels at 24 frames per second.

This was updated with improvements such as an increased buffer and processor following the release of RX100 VI

Cyber-shot DSC-RX100 VI
On 5 June 2018, Sony announced the RX100 VI. In this iteration, Sony introduced a new ZEISS Vario-Sonnar T* 24-200mmi 2.8 – 4.5 lens zoom lens. In addition, Sony once again improved the auto focus performance, improving the auto focus speed to .03 seconds. Other performance improvements in continuous shooting and 4K motion video were also made.

Cyber-shot DSC-RX100 VII
On 25 July 2019, Sony announced the RX100 VII. New features include unlimited video duration (previously ) and a 3.5mm TRS stereo minijack for connecting an external microphone (previously none).

Model differences

References

External links
 
 
 Sony Singapore – Cyber-shot DSC-RX100 – Power in your pocket (microsite – Product developers interview)
 Cyber-shot Digital Camera DSC-RX100 – Sony US
 DSC-RX100 – Sony UK
Cyber-shot DSC-RX100 II:
 Cyber-shot Digital Camera RX100 II – Sony US

RX100
Cameras introduced in 2012
Digital cameras with CMOS image sensor